Simón Alonso Ramírez Cuevas (born 3 November 1998) is a Chilean professional footballer who plays as a defender for Unión Española.

Personal life
His twin brother, Antonio Ramírez, is also a professional footballer. Along with Simón, he has played for Huachipato, Chile U17 and Universidad de Concepción.

References

External links
 
 

1998 births
Living people
Sportspeople from Concepción, Chile
Chilean footballers
Association football defenders
C.D. Huachipato footballers
Chilean Primera División players
S.L. Benfica B players
Belenenses SAD players
Universidad de Concepción footballers
Unión La Calera footballers
Liga Portugal 2 players
Primeira Liga players
Chilean expatriate footballers
Chilean expatriate sportspeople in Portugal
Expatriate footballers in Portugal
21st-century Chilean people